"Lemonade" is a song by American hip hop collective and record label Internet Money featuring rappers Gunna, Don Toliver and Nav. It was released on August 14, 2020 as the second single from Internet Money's debut studio album, B4 the Storm, and later included as a bonus track on Nav's fourth studio album Demons Protected by Angels (2022). In this "bouncy", "summer" song, Toliver uses identical lines from Lemonade by Jozzy in the pre-chorus and chorus of the song.

The music video premiered along with the song on Lyrical Lemonade and followed a SpongeBob SquarePants theme. A remix of the song, with Roddy Ricch, was released on September 30, 2020, along with a second remix adding Anuel AA was released on November 20, 2020.

"Lemonade" peaked at number six on the US Billboard Hot 100 and topped the charts in the United Kingdom, Greece, and Portugal. The song also peaked within the top ten of the charts in several other countries, including Australia, Canada, Denmark, Germany, New Zealand, the Republic of Ireland and Sweden, which became the highest-charting single for Internet Money, Don Toliver, and Nav.

The pre-chorus and chorus of the song have had significant use as backing music on the popular short-form video sharing platform TikTok, with more than 463,000 videos being created using the song  as of the 20th of February 2023. This success on social media during the COVID-19 lockdowns in 2020 was very influential to the song's  chart success and viral status.

Background
"Lemonade" was first teased by Internet Money founder Taz Taylor during an Instagram Live session in June 2020. The same month, producer Nick Mira confirmed a collaboration between the three artists on Twitter, while Gunna also previewed the song on his Instagram. The track was officially announced by the producers in a July interview with Lyrical Lemonade, who worked on the song's official video.

The song was conceived in 2017 by Taylor and artist-producers Jozzy and Johnny Yukon. Toliver ended up on the song after their label APG offered Taylor old records by Toliver. He received the original, a capella version, without Toliver's knowledge. Producer and writer Alec Wigdahl then added the guitar to the track. Taylor originally planned to have Toliver's label boss Travis Scott on the song, because the guitar melody reminded him of Scott's 2018 song, "Yosemite", which also featured Gunna and Nav. The collaboration came to full circle when Gunna was added, which then led to Nav's feature, due to Gunna's close relationship with Nav and his record label XO. Eventually, Toliver gave his blessing for the song. At the same time, Toliver and Gunna were working with his DJ Chase B on a song called "Cafeteria", which was released just weeks prior to "Lemonade". Gunna believed he had recorded a verse for the former track, but Taz Taylor stated Gunna luckily recorded the verses for both songs. "Lemonade" was finished and mixed in mid-2020 along with the rest of the album. It experienced numerous leaks before being officially released.

Gunna and Nav have collaborated eight previous times, including on "Yosemite" and "Turks" (both with Travis Scott). Other collaborations include "Codeine" by Nav and "Nothing 4 Free" by Gunna.

Composition
Over a "bouncy", guitar-laden beat, the song finds Gunna and Nav delivering their "usual rockstar talk", with Toliver performing both the pre-chorus and chorus. Uproxx's Wongo Okon noted how the artists are "fascinated by the shine and icy nature of their yellow diamonds" as they "relish in their successful careers".

Critical reception
Revolt's Jon Powell called the song "infectious". Erika Marie of HotNewHipHop gave it a "VERY HOTTTTT" rating, opining that with the "hitmaking trifecta" on the track, "it's sure to quickly be in heavy rotation among rap fans". Complexs Jessica  McKinney named it among the best releases of the week, and noted Gunna and Nav for being "emotional as they lay down intoxicating verses about their rags-to-riches stories and heavy drug use". Ryan Shepard of Def Pen called the track a "summer banger" and referenced the COVID-19 pandemic, an ongoing pandemic at the time of the release of the song, stating: "you'll just have to enjoy it from your own backyard and patio".

Remixes
On September 29, 2020, the official remix of the song was released with fellow American rapper Roddy Ricch. It contains a verse from Toliver that was intended to be on the original version but was canceled for unknown reasons. The remix was released without Gunna and Nav's verses, and instead contains Toliver's original verse and Ricch's new verse. On November 20, 2020, a Latin remix of the track adding Puerto Rican rapper Anuel AA was released. The remix brings back Nav and Gunna's verses from the original, as well as a Spanish verse sung by Anuel.

Music video
The music video was released alongside the song. It was directed by Cole Bennett for his Lyrical Lemonade channel. Cole had listened to B4 the Storm prior to the video shoot and expressed his love for "Lemonade". Internet Money producers Nick Mira and Taz Taylor recalled how cooperative Bennett and his team were despite the weather being very hot. The visual is reminiscent of the Nickelodeon television show SpongeBob SquarePants and sees the artists living "lavish" lifestyles underwater as they swim in a fishbowl of lemonade. Gunna is sitting above in a boat fishing while Don Toliver and Nav are seen around mermaids and other sea creatures. Revolt's Jon Powell noted how they show off "futuristic old-school whips and high ends jewelry and threads to match".

The music video for the remix was released on October 27, 2020, on Internet Money's YouTube channel. In the video, Taz Taylor and Nick Mira cruise around a city in a lemonade truck, giving out lemonade to people. The truck contains logos from Cole Bennett's association Lyrical Lemonade, who also directed the original music video. It also shows a banner promoting Internet Money's debut studio album, B4 the Storm, for which the original song appears and the remix appears as part of the complete edition. The video also contains cameos from Don Toliver himself and rapper and singer Lil Nas X.

Charts

Weekly charts

Year-end charts

Certifications

Release history

See also
List of Billboard Hot 100 top-ten singles in 2020
List of number-one singles of 2020 (Portugal)
List of Rolling Stone Top 100 number-one songs of 2020
List of top 10 singles in 2020 (Australia)
List of top 10 singles in 2020 (Ireland)
List of UK top-ten singles in 2020

References

2020 singles
2020 songs
Internet Money songs
Nav (rapper) songs
Gunna (rapper) songs
Songs written by Gunna (rapper)
Don Toliver songs
Songs written by Don Toliver
Songs written by Nav (rapper)
Songs written by Nick Mira
Song recordings produced by Taz Taylor (record producer)
Songs written by Taz Taylor (record producer)
Music videos directed by Cole Bennett
UK Singles Chart number-one singles
Number-one singles in Greece
Number-one singles in Portugal
Pop-rap songs